Kisimani Mafia (Magofu ya kale ya Kisimani Mafia in Swahili ) is a national historic site located in Mafia District of Pwani Region. They are Mafia's oldest ruins, which are close to Kilindoni. The earliest strata of mosques, according to archaeologist Neville Chittick who performed excavations there in the 1950s, date from about the tenth and eleventh centuries. However, many of them have since been washed into the sea.

Tanzanian archaeologist Felix Chami has recently finished his work on the Mafia, pushing back the origins of the Swahili peoples of the coast and their connections to both the interior of Africa and the Indian Ocean. Ancient coins occasionally turn up on beach washouts, and portions of the crumbling walls can be seen in the ocean just offshore.

References

Historic sites in Tanzania